Brookshire Grocery Company is a Tyler, Texas-based supermarket chain. There are more than 200 stores operating in Texas, Louisiana, Arkansas, and Oklahoma under their five banners, Brookshire's, Super 1 Foods, Fresh by Brookshire's, Spring Market, and Reasor's.

History 
The company was founded in 1928 by Wood T. and Louise Brookshire when they opened their first 25 x  store on Tyler’s downtown square. 

Brookshire's was originally part of the Brookshire Brothers chain, which was founded seven years earlier in Lufkin, Texas. The companies split in 1939 when Wood T. Brookshire took control of the Tyler-area stores in exchange for his share in the Brookshire Brothers partnership. The companies are no longer related except by name.

In the 1940s, the company expanded to other neighboring communities and opened its first shopping center location. Brookshire’s first warehouse opened in Tyler in 1953.

The company has expanded into Louisiana and the construction of a 175,000-square-foot (16,300 m2) distribution center in Tyler in the 1960s.

In 1984, the company opened the first of several Super 1 Foods stores in Alexandria, LA. Super 1 Foods was originally a no-frills, warehouse format. Initially, stores were opened in recycled buildings to cut down on costs, but later the company began building stores. In several cases (#608 in Shreveport and #612 in Longview), existing Brookshire's stores were closed and demolished to build a Super 1 Foods store. In Marshall and Longview, existing Brookshire's stores were converted to the Super 1 format.

The company opened several Super 1 Foods stores in the Dallas/Fort Worth area in the late 1990s and early 2000s, some of which were replacements for nearby Brookshire's locations. The company sold all metro area stores to (now defunct) Fleming, which re-branded them as Rainbow Foods. All Rainbow stores were closed when Fleming went out of business.

In 2012, a new format Super 1 Foods store was built in Carencro, LA., with a floorplan and decor package that would be rolled out to all the other stores. A similar store was built to replace #610 in Tyler; others have since opened.

The Brookshire Grocery Company also opened FRESH by Brookshire's in Tyler, TX on March 10, 2011. The store was designed to give an upscale shopping experience and features a bakery and many organic items. The first annual FRESH 15 Road Race was held on March 1, 2014, and continues yearly. The second FRESH by Brookshire's location opened in Fate, TX on March 2, 2022, as the anchor store to a new shopping district.

Along with the FRESH 15, Brookshire’s and Super 1 Foods host a half marathon, 5K, and Kids 1K named Heroes Run, benefiting local first responders and military heroes. This event takes place in Shreveport, LA with 1,500 participants in 2016 raising $40,000 for charity. 

In June 2016, Brookshire's purchased 25 stores formerly owned by Wal-Mart (formerly their Wal-Mart Express brand). The stores, located in Texas (20 stores) and Louisiana (five stores) were re-branded as Spring Market.

In November 2021, Brookshire's announced their acquisition of all 17 Reasor's locations in northeast Oklahoma, to be finalized in 2022.

Today 
Today the company has more than 14,000 employee/partners at over 150 locations. BGC has five brands: Brookshire's, Super 1 Foods, Fresh by Brookshire's, Spring Market, and Reasor's. 

The company also operates three distribution facilities — two based in Tyler, TX, and one in Monroe, LA — with more than 2 million total square feet and a company fleet of 72 tractors and more than 300 trailers. BGC’s internal manufacturing facilities include bakery, dairy, ice cream, yogurt, fresh-cut, ice and water/drink plants, all in the Tyler area.

Mississippi operations
In 2002, Brookshire's bought four Albertsons stores in Mississippi. These stores were located in North Jackson, South Jackson, Ridgeland, and Flowood. The North Jackson store was the newest of the four locations, having opened in 2001, while the three other area stores opened in 1997.

On February 11, 2010, after a decline in market grocery shares against Kroger and Walmart, Brookshire's exited Mississippi with a sale of the Flowood and Ridgeland stores to Kroger and a closure of the two Jackson stores. In late 2011, Brookshire's sold their South Jackson store to Kosciusko, MS based supermarket chain Food Depot, operated by Potter and Sims Foods. The North Jackson location was converted into a Virginia College location. Virginia College closed in December 2018. The former grocery store remains vacant.

References

3. https://www.theadvertiser.com/story/news/local/2018/05/24/local-world-war-ii-veterans-fly-washington-memorial-day/640718002/

Companies based in Tyler, Texas
Economy of Arkansas
Economy of Louisiana
Economy of Mississippi
Supermarkets of the United States
Retail companies established in 1928
1928 establishments in Texas